Simba is a fictional character who appears in Disney's The Lion King franchise.

Simba may also refer to:

Arts and entertainment

Film 
 Simba (1955 film), a British drama film 
 Simba (2019 film), an Indian Tamil comedy film
 Simba: King of the Beasts, a 1928 silent documentary film
 Simmba, a 2018 Indian Hindi-language action comedy film

Music
 Simba (album), by O'Donel Levy, 1974
 S1mba, British rapper
 "Simba", song by Les Baxter

Businesses and brands
 Simba (South African company), a South African snack food manufacturer 
 Simba (soft drink), marketed by Coca-Cola during the 60s and 70s 
 Simba Chips, a South African brand of potato chips
 Simba Dickie Group, a German toy manufacturer
 Simba Sleep, a British mattress company
 Simba Technologies, a Canadian software company
 SIMBA Telecom, a Singaporean telecommunications company

People

Peoples and language
 Simba people, an indigenous people of Gabon
 Simba language, a moribund language of Gabon
 Simba, a subgroup of the Guaraní people of Bolivia
 Western Bolivian Guaraní, a language known locally as Simba

People with the name
 S1mba (born 1999), British rapper
 Amara Simba (born 1961), a French footballer
 Charles Mwando Simba (1935–2016), a Congolese politician
 Didier Ekanza Simba (born 1969), a Congolese footballer
 Jonathan Simba Bwanga (born 2000), a Congolese footballer
 Sophia Simba (born 1950), a Tanzanian politician
 Simba Hall, Mister Continental 2007
 Titus Simba (1941–unknown), a Tanzanian boxer
 Simba Makoni (born 1950), a Zimbabwean politician
 Simba Marumo (born 1978), a South African footballer
 Simba Nhivi (Simbarashe Nhivi Sithole, born 1991), a Zimbabwean footballer 
 Simba Sithole (footballer, born 1989), a Zimbabwean footballer
 Germain Katanga (born 1978), known as Simba, a militia leader in DRC 
 Dwayne Haskins (1997-2022), nicknamed Simba, an American football quarterback

Places
 Simba, Kenya
 Simba Ranch, a settlement in Kenya's Eastern Province
 Simba, Gauteng, a suburb of Johannesburg, South Africa
 Simba, Burkina Faso

Sports
 Simba FC, a Ugandan football club 
 Simba F.C. (Rwanda), a football club from Rwanda
 Simba S.C., a Tanzanian football club
 Kenya national rugby union team, known as the Simbas

Transportation
 Apco Simba, an Israeli paraglider
 GKN Simba, an armoured personnel carrier
 Issoire APM 40 Simba, a light aircraft 
 Rosenbauer Simba, an airport fire truck
 UAZ Simba, a minivan concept

Other uses
Operation Simba, a conflict of the Dhofar Rebellion 1972–1975

See also
 
 
 Simbad (disambiguation)
 Zimba (disambiguation)
 Cimba, a British-built clipper
 Simba rebellion in Congo-Léopoldville, 1964–1965